USS Downes (DE-1070/FF-1070) was the 19th in the series of the s. She was the third ship to be named for Commodore John Downes

Design and description
The Knox-class design was derived from the  modified to extend range and without a long-range missile system. They displaced  at full load. Their crew consisted of 13 officers and 211 enlisted men.

The ships were equipped with one Westinghouse geared steam turbine that drove the single propeller shaft.

The Knox-class ships were armed with a 5"/54 caliber Mark 42 gun forward and a single 3"/50 caliber gun aft. They mounted an eight-round ASROC launcher between the 5-inch (127 mm) gun and the bridge. Close-range anti-submarine defense was provided by two twin  Mk 32 torpedo tubes. The ships were equipped with a torpedo-carrying DASH drone helicopter; its telescoping hangar and landing pad were positioned amidships aft of the mack. Beginning in the 1970s, the DASH was replaced by a SH-2 Seasprite LAMPS I helicopter and the hangar and landing deck were accordingly enlarged. Most ships also had the 3-inch (76 mm) gun replaced by an eight-cell BPDMS missile launcher in the early 1970s.

Construction and career 
Downes Was featured on Season 1 Episode 4 of Simon and Simon titled "A Recipe for Disaster" Directly after the opening credits - episode aired on 17 Dec 1981.

Downess keel was laid 5 September 1968 by Todd Pacific Shipyards Corp., Seattle, Washington, and was christened on 13 December 1969 during launching by her sponsor Mrs. Philip L. Kelton, the great-granddaughter of the late Commodore John Downes. The ship was commissioned 28 August 1971

Downes performed Anti-Submarine Warfare operations as a part of Destroyer Squadron 31, escort duty and naval diplomacy support, when necessary, for the Pacific Fleet. During RIMPAC 89, the ship rescued one of two crew members washed overboard due to heavy seas.  Decommissioned on 5 June 1992, Downes was stricken from the Naval Vessel Register on 11 January 1995.

Downes was disposed during fleet training in 2003 and sunk close to Mare Island during a SINKEX.

Notes

References

External links
 
 NavSource images
 Navysite.de

 

Ships built in Seattle
Knox-class frigates
1969 ships
Ships sunk as targets
Cold War frigates and destroyer escorts of the United States